The siege of Bourbon was a Frankish siege of the Aquitanian fortress of Bourbon in 761 during the Aquitanian War. The Frankish army under King Pepin the Short invested, stormed and burned the fortress, taking the garrison prisoner.

Prelude
In 761, the Duke of Aquitaine Waiofar launched an invasion of Francia, advancing on the Frankish bases of Autun and Chalon and the royal residence of Mailly. King Pepin the Short of Francia was furious at Waiofar's actions and ordered a Frankish army to assemble at the Loire river. He was accompanied by his son Charles.

Siege
Pepin's army marched to Bourbon by way of Troyes, Auxerre and Nevers, where he crossed the Loire. The Frankish army surrounded Bourbon with fortified camps. They then stormed the Aquitanian fortress and set it on fire. The survivors of the garrison deployed there by Waiofar were taken prisoner. These men were referred to by the continuator of Fredegar as men of Waiofar, homines Waiofarii, indicating they were not permanent residents of Bourbon.

Aftermath
Pepin's army rampaged through Aquitaine, devastating the Duchy. His next target was the fortress of Clermont in Auvergne, which he besieged later that year.

Citations

Bibliography
 
 
 

Bourbon 761
Bourbon
761
8th century in Francia